Uinta County School District #4 is a public school district based in Mountain View, Wyoming, United States.

Geography
Uinta County School District #4 serves central and southeastern Uinta County, including the following communities:

Incorporated places
Town of Mountain View
Census-designated places (Note: All census-designated places are unincorporated.)
Carter
Fort Bridger
Lonetree
Robertson

Schools
Mountain View High School (Grades 9–12)
Mountain View Middle School (Grades 5–8) Closed at the end of the 2013-14 School Year
Fort Bridger Elementary School (Grades 3–4) Closed at the end of the 2013-14 School Year
Mountain View Elementary School (Grades K-2) Closed at the end of the 2013-14 School Year
Mountain View K8 School ( Grades K-8) Opened at the beginning of the 2014-15 School Year

Student demographics
The following figures are as of October 1, 2008.

Total District Enrollment: 730
Student enrollment by gender
Male: 385 (52.74%)
Female: 345 (47.26%)
Student enrollment by ethnicity
White (not Hispanic): 714 (97.81%)
Hispanic: 8 (1.10%)
American Indian or Alaskan Native: 5 (0.68%)
Black (not Hispanic): 2 (0.27%)
Asian or Pacific Islander: 1 (0.14%)

See also
List of school districts in Wyoming

References

External links
Uinta County School District #4 – official site

Education in Uinta County, Wyoming
School districts in Wyoming